The La Costa Film Festival  (LCFF), founded in 2013, is an annual four-day film festival hosted at the Omni La Costa Resort and Spa in Carlsbad, California. The film festival showcases an array of full-feature and short films, galas, and annually honors renowned actors with the Legacy Award who have significantly contributed to film, arts, and the community. Previous Legacy Award recipients include Andy Garcia (2013), and Ed Harris (2014).

References

External links 
 Official La Costa Film Festival website

Film festivals in California
Culture of San Diego
Tourist attractions in San Diego County, California